Stonerside Stable is an American Thoroughbred horse breeding farm and horse racing operation near Paris, Kentucky. Until September 2008 it was owned by Robert and Janice McNair, who also own the National Football League team, the Houston Texans. They sold the highly successful operation to the Darley racing conglomerate of Sheikh Mohammed of Dubai.

Stonerside Stable is a finalist for the Eclipse Award for Outstanding Breeder for 2008.

References
 Stonerside Farm History on Darley's website

American racehorse owners and breeders
Buildings and structures in Bourbon County, Kentucky
Horse farms in Kentucky